Gerhard Pilz (born August 17, 1965) is an Austrian luger who competed from 1985 to 2007. A natural track luger, he won ten medals at the FIL World Luge Natural Track Championships with five gold (Singles: 1986, 1990, 1992, 1994, 1996), four silver (Singles: 2000, 2003, 2007. Mixed team: 2003), and one bronze (Singles: 2001).

Pilz found less success at the FIL European Luge Natural Track Championships in the men's singles event, winning only four medals (gold: 2002, 2004; silver: 1989, bronze: 1997).

Pilz retired at the end of the 2006-07 season.

References
FIL-Luge profile
Natural track European Championships results 1970-2006 (eiskanal.com)
Natural track World Championships results: 1979-2007 (eiskanal.com)
Pilz announces retirement

External links 
 

1965 births
Living people
Austrian male lugers